A vestibuled train is a passenger train whose cars have enclosed vestibules at their ends, in contrast to the open platforms on early cars. Typically, a vestibule has doorways on either side to allow passenger entry and exit at stations, a door into the body of the car, and, at the car end, a doorway to allow access to the next car through a flexible gangway connection.

History 
The first vestibuled train was introduced on June 15, 1887, on the inaugural run of the Pennsylvania Limited of the Pennsylvania Railroad, forerunner of the famous Broadway Limited.

The railway car vestibule as a concept had been tried in various primitive forms during the latter part of the 19th century, but the first viable form was invented by H. H. Sessions and his staff at the Pullman Car Works in Chicago. Sessions' patent was challenged by others and reduced in litigation to the spring mechanism of his vestibule design.  Further litigation by Pullman was successful in modifying the earlier rulings.

Prior to the development of vestibules, passage between cars when a train was underway was both dangerous—stepping over a shifting plate between swaying cars with nothing on either side but chain guard rails—and unpleasant, due to being exposed to the weather, as well as soot, red-hot cinders and fly ash raining down from the exhaust of the steam locomotive hauling the train. As passengers were mostly confined to a single car during the trip, trains had regular meal stops built into their schedules, and sleeping cars were uncommon. The introduction of the vestibuled train in the late nineteenth century led to dining cars, lounge cars, and other specialized cars.

Vestibuled cars allowed the development of luxury trains during the golden age of rail travel, trains like the Union Pacific's Overland Limited (1890), the Pennsylvania Railroad's Pennsylvania Limited (later renamed the Pennsylvania Special, then the Broadway Limited), and the New York Central's 20th Century Limited (1902). The Southern's Crescent was introduced in 1891 as the Washington and Southwestern Vestibuled Limited, and widely known as The Vestibule because it was the first all-year train south of Washington with vestibuled equipment.

See also 
 Aisle
 Compartment coach
 Corridor coach
 Gangway connection
Open coach

References

External links
 US Patent 373,098, Issued November 15, 1887, USPTO Database
 Ad from 1899 for the Washington and Southwestern Vestibule Train

Passenger railroad cars
Passenger rail rolling stock
Rail technologies